Glenmaggie is a town in Victoria, Australia, located on the shores of Lake Glenmaggie, in the Shire of Wellington.  At the 2016 census, Glenmaggie and the surrounding area had a population of 277.

Glenmaggie Post Office opened on 1 January 1872 and closed in 1986.

Lake Glenmaggie is popular for waterskiing and boating. On 14 March 1942, a RAAF Wirraway crashed into the lake, killing the pilot.

References

Towns in Victoria (Australia)
Shire of Wellington